Sally Belfrage (October 4, 1936 – March 14, 1994) was a United States-born British-based 20th century non-fiction writer and international journalist. Her writing covered turmoils in Northern Ireland, the American Civil Rights Movement and her own memoirs about her life.  According to her obituary in The New York Times, she was 'an intelligent and humorous journalist and critic who ardently searched for the truth'.

Life
Sally Mary Caroline Belfrage was born in Hollywood, California, on 4 October 1936.  Her parents, Cedric Belfrage and Molly Castle, later moved to New York where Sally studied at the Bronx High School of Science and Hunter College,  before her parents were deported to London as alleged Communists. After her return to England, Sally Belfrage matriculated at the London School of Economics, and after graduation she attended 6th World Festival of Youth and Students in Moscow, went to Communist China  and worked for the Foreign Languages Publishing House, Moscow, in 1957.

Belfrage became a social activist and world traveller. Her books include The Crack: A Belfast Year (1987, retitled Living with War: A Belfast Year for United States distribution), Un-American Activities: A Memoir of the Fifties (1995), Freedom Summer (1999), A Room in Moscow (1966), and Flowers of Emptiness: Reflections on an Ashram.  In 1969, Belfrage signed a war tax resistance vow, along with 447 other American writers and editors. It was published in the January 30, 1969 edition of the New York Post.

Death
Sally Belfrage lived most of her life in London, where she died at Middlesex Hospital from lung cancer (adenocarcinoma) in 1994 at age 57.

Marriage and family
In 1965, she married Bernard Pomerance who was best known for his play, The Elephant Man. They had two children: Eve Pomerance, a casting director in Hollywood, and Moby Pomerance, a playwright.   

Belfrage's brother was Nicolas Belfrage, the wine critic.  Her father's brother was Bruce Belfrage, the BBC Newsreader during World War II, and her great uncle was Bryan Powley, the actor.

References

1936 births
1994 deaths
20th-century American journalists
20th-century American memoirists
20th-century American women writers
20th-century British journalists
20th-century English memoirists
20th-century English women writers
American women memoirists
American tax resisters
English journalists
Alumni of the London School of Economics
Deaths from lung cancer in England
American women journalists
American emigrants to England
People from Hollywood, Los Angeles
British expatriates in the Soviet Union
The Bronx High School of Science alumni
Hunter College alumni